Bezabeh Meleyo Mekengo (born 26 June 1995) is an Ethiopian professional footballer who plays as an attacking midfielder for Ethiopian Premier League club Fasil Kenema and the Ethiopia national team.

International career
Meleyo made his international debut with the Ethiopia national team in a 0–0 friendly tie with Sierra Leone on 26 August 2021.

Honours
Wolaitta Dicha
Ethiopian Cup: 2017

Fasil Kenema
Ethiopian Premier League: 2020–21

References

External links
 

1995 births
Living people
Ethiopian footballers
Ethiopia international footballers
Ethiopian Premier League players
Association football midfielders
Wolaitta Dicha S.C. players
Fasil Kenema S.C. players
2021 Africa Cup of Nations players